The case Application of the International Convention for the Suppression of the Financing of Terrorism and of the International Convention on the Elimination of All Forms of Racial Discrimination (Ukraine v. Russian Federation) is a case in the International Court of Justice (ICJ). On January 16, 2017, a representative of Ukraine filed a lawsuit at the International Court of Justice to hold the Russian Federation liable for committing acts of "terrorism" and discrimination against Ukraine. The lawsuit alleges violations of the Terrorist Financing Convention and International Convention on the Elimination of All Forms of Racial Discrimination.

Judgment
On March 6, 2017, hearings began on Ukraine's application for preventive measures, which lasted until March 9. Preventive measures will allow the Court to prevent the deterioration of the situation and to protect the civilian population for the length of time necessary to hear the case. Consideration of the merits of the claim will continue regardless of the Court's ruling on the request for the application of preventive measures.

On April 19, 2017, a precautionary decision was announced. The International Court of Justice in The Hague ruled that Russia should refrain from imposing restrictions on the Mejlis of the Crimean Tatar People and allow it to resume its activities. The ICJ denied Ukraine approval of provisional measures against Russia on prohibition of terrorist financing.

On November 8, 2019, the court found that it has jurisdiction to hear the case on the basis of anti-terrorism and anti-discrimination treaties over Russia's alleged support for separatists in Crimea and Eastern Ukraine. Also the ICJ rejected Moscow’s call on preliminary objections.

External links
 The case on ICJ website

References

International Court of Justice cases
2019 in Ukraine
2019 in Russia
Anti-discrimination law
Russia–Ukraine relations
Russo-Ukrainian War
Politics of the Crimean Tatars